Miss America 1967, the 40th Miss America pageant, was held at the Boardwalk Hall in Atlantic City, New Jersey on September 10, 1966. It was televised in the United States on NBC.

Although an entry representing the city of Tulsa had been victorious in the 1926 pageant, Jane Anne Jayroe became the first woman with the title of Miss Oklahoma to win the crown.

Jayroe's unique performance in the talent competition had her conducting the Miss America orchestra while singing the Len Barry hit "1-2-3." She later became an executive with Oklahoma's state tourism bureau and an Oklahoma City television news anchor.

Results

Order of announcements

Top 10

Top 5

Awards

Preliminary awards

Other awards

Contestants

References

External links
 Miss America official website

1967
1966 in the United States
1967 beauty pageants
1966 in New Jersey
September 1966 events in the United States
Events in Atlantic City, New Jersey